Doto tuberculata is a species of sea slug, a nudibranch, a marine gastropod mollusc in the family Dotidae.

Distribution
The holotype for this species was collected in Killary Harbour, Ireland. The original description also cites specimens from the Mewstone and near the Eddystone Rocks, Plymouth, England, and Skird Rocks, Galway Bay. It has subsequently been reported widely in Britain and Ireland.

Description
This nudibranch is pale brown with black spots on the ceratal tubercles. There are rows of tubercles tipped with black spots running across the body between the cerata; typically four tubercles in a row.

EcologyDoto tuberculata feeds on the hydroid Sertularella gayi'', family Sertulariidae.

References

Dotidae
Gastropods described in 1976